Øyer is a municipality in Innlandet county, Norway. It is located in the traditional district of Gudbrandsdal. The administrative centre of the municipality is the village of Tingberg. The two largest villages in the municipality are Granrudmoen and Tretten.

The  municipality is the 182nd largest by area out of the 356 municipalities in Norway. Øyer is the 181st most populous municipality in Norway with a population of 5,082.

General information

The parish of Øier (later spelled Øyer) was established as a municipality on 1 January 1838 (see formannskapsdistrikt law). On 1 January 1867, a small area of Øier (population: 40) was transferred to the neighboring municipality of Gausdal. The borders of Øyer have not changed since that time.

Name
The municipality (and parish) were named after the old Øier farm ( / accusative case and dative case) since this that was the site of the old Øyer Church which had been located there for centuries. The name comes from the word Øyi (nominative case). Two lakes in Norway had the name Øyi(r) in Old Norse times (now called Øymark and Øyeren), and these names are derived from the word øy which means "flat and fertile land along the edge of the water". This name is probably given to this area because the Gudbrandsdalslågen river widens out in the central part of the municipality and creates two river-lakes (called the Jemnefjorden and Gildbusfjorden). Øyi was probably the old name of one (or both) of these "fjords". Prior to 1918, the name was spelled "Øier".

Coat of arms
The coat of arms was granted on 29 April 1983. This is a type of ring that was historically made of wood and it was used to fasten a tree trunk to a rope in order to haul it over the land. Similar devices were used all over Norway, but this shape is typical for this area.

Churches
The Church of Norway has two parishes within the municipality of Øyer. It is part of the Sør-Gudbrandsdal prosti (deanery) in the Diocese of Hamar.

History
The Black Death reached Norway in the winter of 1349-1350. Øyer was one of the parishes that was most severely impacted. Estimates based on tax payments suggest that between 66-75% of all residents died. Many of the farms there became deserted farms, which remained vacant until the late 17th century. The Tretten Church parish (which had been a separate parish from Øyer) was merged with the Øyer Church parish after the Black Death, because the decimated population of Tretten no longer could maintain their own priest.

Economy

Øyer has traditionally been a farming and logging municipality.

Recreation is increasingly important economically. Since it opened in 1989, Øyer's Hafjell Alpine Ski Center has grown to include 15 lifts (with an additional in construction) and 28 runs as wells as extensive cross-country skiing runs. Tobogganing, luge, and bobsled racing (on the 1994 Olympic course) are also found in the area.

Government
All municipalities in Norway, including Øyer, are responsible for primary education (through 10th grade), outpatient health services, senior citizen services, unemployment and other social services, zoning, economic development, and municipal roads.  The municipality is governed by a municipal council of elected representatives, which in turn elects a mayor.  The municipality falls under the Vestre Innlandet District Court and the Eidsivating Court of Appeal.

Municipal council
The municipal council  of Øyer is made up of 21 representatives that are elected to four year terms.  The party breakdown of the council is as follows:

Mayors
The mayors of Øyer (incomplete list):

1946-1947: Ole Hageløkken (V)
1948-1955: Erl. Skjønsberg (Sp)
1956-1959: Einar Bræin (V)
1960-1975: Lars Bjerke (Sp)
1976-1979: Geir Korslund (Ap)
1980-1983: Einar Moe (Sp)
1984-1987: Arne Bueie (Ap)
1988–1995: Ola Prestegarden (Sp)
1996-1999: Rigmor Aarø Spiten (Sp)
1999-2007: Ole Hageløkken (Ap)
2007-2015: Mari Botterud (H)
2015–2019: Brit Kramprud Lundgård (Ap)
2019–present: Jon Halvor Midtmageli (Sp)

Geography
Øyer municipality is bordered by Ringebu Municipality to the north, Stor-Elvdal Municipality to the east, Ringsaker Municipality to the southeast, Lillehammer Municipality to the south, and Gausdal Municipality to the west. The municipality is divided into two parishes: Øyer in the south and Tretten in the north.

The municipality is located in the Gudbrandsdal valley, through which the Gudbrandsdalslågen river flows. The lake Losna is partially located in the municipality.

Notable residents

 Anders Lysgaard (1756 in Tretten – 1827) farmer and sheriff, rep. at the Norwegian Constituent Assembly
 Johannes Skar (1837 in Øyer - 1914) a Norwegian educator and folklorist
 Matias Skard (1846 at Øyer - 1927) philologist, educator, psalmist and essayist
 Anton Kraabel (1862 in Øyer – 1934) the 11th Lieutenant Governor of North Dakota
 Simon Johnson (1874 in Øyer – 1970) Norwegian-American newspaper editor and author
 Ottar Grepstad (born 1953 in Øyer) a Norwegian Nynorsk writer
 Kjetil-Vidar Haraldstad (born 1973 in Øyer) drummer in black metal bands Satyricon & 1349

Sport 
 Ole Stenen (1903 in Øyer – 1975) a Nordic skier, silver medallist at the 1932 Winter Olympics
 Erling Jevne (born 1966) skier, team gold and silver medallist at the 1998 Winter Olympics
 Roger Hjelmstadstuen (born 1979 in Øyer) a retired snowboarder, competed at the 1998 Winter Olympics
 Aleksander Melås (born 1998 in Øyer) a retired Norwegian luger.

Twin towns – sister cities

Øyer has sister city agreements with the following places:
 Färgelanda, Sweden
 Muhos, Finland

References

External links

Municipal fact sheet from Statistics Norway *

Church Records for those with ancestors from Øyer. Baptisms and deaths between 1671 and 1857. 

 
Municipalities of Innlandet
1838 establishments in Norway